Walter Stanley (born November 5, 1962) is a former professional American football wide receiver for ten seasons in the National Football League for the Green Bay Packers, the Detroit Lions, the Washington Redskins, the New England Patriots, and the San Diego Chargers.  He played college football at the University of Colorado and Mesa State College and was drafted in the fourth round of the 1985 NFL Draft.

Stanley caught 130 passes during his pro career for 2,213 yards and five touchdowns.

He was a standout punt and kickoff returner. In a game between the Packers and Lions played at the Pontiac Silverdome stadium in November 1986, with just 41 seconds to play, Stanley was instructed by Green Bay coach Forrest Gregg to make a fair catch of a Detroit punt. On his own, he caught the ball and took off running, scoring an 83-yard touchdown that gave the Packers a last-minute 44-40 victory.

In that same game, Stanley caught a pair of touchdown passes from Packers quarterback Randy Wright.

During his college career, Stanley led the Big Eight Conference one season in punt and kickoff returns and all-purpose yardage. But he was suspended from the Colorado team for disciplinary reasons, and ended up transferring to Mesa State. Stanley was selected in the fourth round of the 1985 NFL Draft by the Packers, the 98th player chosen.

He is a graduate of South Shore High School in Chicago.

1962 births
Living people
American football return specialists
American football wide receivers
Colorado Buffaloes football players
Detroit Lions players
Green Bay Packers players
Colorado Mesa Mavericks football players
New England Patriots players
Players of American football from Chicago
San Diego Chargers players
Washington Redskins players